The 2013 Dominion Tankard, southern Ontario's men's provincial curling championship, was held from February 4 to 10 at the Barrie Molson Centre in Barrie, Ontario. The winning team of Glenn Howard will represent Ontario at the 2013 Tim Hortons Brier in Edmonton, Alberta.

Howard won his 15th provincial championship, and continued his record 8th straight title by defeating Joe Frans in the final.

Teams

Round-robin standings
Final round-robin standings

Results

Draw 1
February 4, 14:00

Draw 2
February 4, 19:30

Draw 3
February 4, 19:30

Draw 4
February 4, 19:00

Draw 5
February 6, 09:00

Draw 6
February 6, 14:00

Draw 7
February 6, 19:00

Draw 8
February 7, 14:00

Draw 9
February 7, 19:00

Draw 10
February 8, 14:00

Draw 11
February 8, 19:00

Playoffs

1 vs. 2
Saturday, February 9, 2:00 pm

3 vs. 4
Saturday, February 9, 7:00 pm

Semifinal
Sunday, February 10, 9:30 am

Final
Sunday, February 10, 2:30 pm

Qualification
Southern Ontario zones run from November 30-December 2, and December 7–11, 2012. Two teams from each zone qualify to 4 regional tournaments, and two teams from each of the two tournaments qualify to provincials. Two additional teams qualify out of a second chance qualifier.  As defending champions, the Glenn Howard rink from the Coldwater and District Curling Club get an automatic berth in the Tankard.

Regional Qualifiers In Bold

Zone Qualification

Zone 1
December 7–9, at the RCMP Curling Club, Ottawa

Teams entered:
Mark Homan (Ottawa)
Alexander Dyer (Ottawa)
Spencer Cooper (Ottawa)
Shane Latimer (Ottawa)
Ron Hrycak (Ottawa)
Gary Rowe (Ottawa)
Ian MacAulay (RCMP)
Marc Bourguignon (RCMP)

Zone 2
December 7–9, at the RCMP Curling Club, Ottawa

Teams entered:

Dave Van Dine (Rideau)
Greg Richardson (Rideau)
Frank O'Driscoll (Rideau)
Howard Rajala (Rideau)
Don Bowser (Rideau)

Zone 3
December 7–9, at the Arnprior Curling Club, Arnprior

Teams entered:

Doug Johnston (Arnprior) 
Bryan Cochrane (City View)
Colin Dow (Huntley)
Damien Villard (Renfrew)

Zone 4
December 7–9, at the Royal Kingston Curling Club, Kingston

Teams entered:

Andrew Minty (Cataraqui)
Bryce Rowe (Land O'Lakes)
Greg Balsdon (Loonie)
Jeff Clark (Loonie)
Michael Bryson (Loonie)
Rob Dickson (Napanee)
Dave Collyer (Quinte)
Dennis Murray (Quinte)

Zone 5
December 7–9, at the Fenelon Falls Curling Club, Fenelon Falls

Teams entered:

Shannon Beddows (Cannington)
Connor Duhaime (Haliburton)
Malcolm Florence (Lakefield)
Dave Clark (Peterborough)
Douglas Brewer (Peterborough)

Zone 6
December 8–11, at the Oshawa Curling Club, Oshawa

Teams entered:

Mark Kean (Annandale)
Sean Aune (Annandale)
Jason March (Annandale)
Tim Morrison (Oshawa)
David Fischer (Oshawa Golf)
John Bell (Unionville)
Bruce Jefferson (Uxbridge)
Rob Lobel (Whitby)

Zone 7
December 7–9, at the Bayview Golf & Country Club, Thornhill

Teams entered:

John Epping (Donalda)
Tom Worth (Bayview)
Robert Morrow (Leaside)
Michael Shepherd (Richmond Hill)
Mike Anderson (Thornhill)
Mike Inglis (Thornhill)
Dave Coutanche (Richmond Hill)

Zone 8
December 8–9, at the St. George's Golf & Country Club, Toronto

Teams entered:

Dennis Moretto (Dixie)
Josh Johnston (Royals)
Josh Grant (Royals)
Darryl Prebble (Royals)
Peter Corner (St. George's)
Wes Johnson (Weston)
Ian Robertson (Royals)

Zone 9
December 7–9, at the Markdale Golf & Curling Club, Markdale

Teams entered:

Al Corbeil (Alliston)
Dayna Deruelle (Brampton)
Rayad Husain (Chinguacousy)
Cory Heggestad (King)

Zone 10
December 7–9, at the Bradford & District Curling Club, Bradford

Teams entered:

Donald Campbell (Barrie)
Joe Frans (Bradford)
Travis Dafoe (Bradford)
Dale Matchett (Cookstown)
Andrew Thompson (Stroud)
Steve Holmes (Parry Sound)

Zone 11
December 7–9, at the Chesley Curling Club, Chesley

Teams entered:

Brent Keeling (Blue Water)
Al Hutchinson (Blue Water)
Jeff Thomson (Chesley)
Chris Heath (Collingwood)
Tim Johns (Meaford)
Steve Gregg (Paisley)
Scott Ballantyne (Tara)
Joey Rettinger (Tara)

Zone 12
November 30-December 2, at the Elora Curling Club, Elora

Teams entered:
Axel Larsen (Elora)
Robert Rumfeldt (Guelph)
Koko Gillis (Guelph)
Dave Kuan (Kitchener-Waterloo Granite)
Jeff Hamley (Ayr)
Peter Mellor (Kitchener-Waterloo Granite)
Geoff Chambers (Kitchener-Waterloo Granite)

Zone 13
December 7–9, at the Glendale Golf & Country Club, Hamilton

Teams entered:

Mark Fletcher (Burlington)
Todd Maslin (Dundas Granite)
Rob Brockbank (Dundas Granite)
Kris Blonski (Dundas Valley)
Jon St. Denis (Glendale)
David Serwatuk (Glendale)
Simon Ouelet (Glendale)
Pat Ferris (Grimsby)
Terry Corbin (St. Catharines)
Daniel Frans (St. Catharines Golf)
Brent Palmer (Burlington)
Rick Thurston (Dundas Granite)
Jackson Westoby-Willis (Hamilton Victoria)

Zone 14
December 7–9, at the Listowel Curling Club, Listowel

Teams entered:

Jake Higgs (Harriston)
Daryl Shane (Listowel)
Mike Aprile (Listowel)
A. J. Schumacher (Walkerton)

Zone 15
December 7–9, at the Aylmer Curling Club, Aylmer

Teams entered:

Bowie Abbis-Mills (Aylmer)
Wayne Tuck, Jr. (Brant)
Brad Hertner (Brant)
Bob Armstrong (Ingersoll)
Nick Rizzo (Brant)

Zone 16
December 7–9, at the Forest Curling & Social Club, Forest

Teams entered:

Dale Kelly (Chatham Granite)
Brett DeKoning (Chatham Granite)
Mac Webster (Forest)
Scott McDonald (Ilderton)
Mike Pruliere (Sarnia)
Tom Pruliere (Sarnia)
John Young, Jr. (Chatham Granite)

Regional qualification

Region 1
January 5–6 , Carleton Place Curling Club, Carleton Place

Region 2
January 5–6 , High Park Club, Toronto

Region 3
January 5–6 , Elmira & District Curling Club, Elmira

Region 4
January 5–6 , Glencoe and District Curling Club, Glencoe

Challenge Round
January 11–14, at the Orangeville Curling Club in Orangeville

External links
Ontario Curling Association - 2013 The Dominion Tankard: Schedules & Draws
Official site

The Dominion Tankard
Ontario Tankard
Sport in Barrie